Hazel Park Schools is a school district headquartered in Hazel Park, Michigan. It serves Hazel Park and a portion of Ferndale.

Schools
Secondary
Hazel Park High School
Hazel Park Junior High School
Beecher Junior High School
Elementary
Hoover Elementary School
United Oaks Elementary School
Webb Elementary School
Webster Elementary School
Other
 Jardon Vocational School

References

External links

Hazel Park Schools

School districts in Michigan
Education in Oakland County, Michigan